Andrew Ryan is a fictional character in the BioShock video game series developed by Irrational Games. He serves as the primary antagonist of the first half of the first BioShock and a minor character in its sequel, BioShock 2 and its prequel, BioShock Infinite: Burial at Sea. Ryan is portrayed as an idealistic business magnate in the 1940s and 1950s; seeking to avoid scrutiny from governments and other oversight, he ordered the secret construction of an underwater city, Rapture. When civil war sees Ryan's vision for a utopia in Rapture collapse into dystopia, he descends into reclusiveness and paranoia. After his victory in the war, he becomes increasingly ruthless in his control over the remaining inhabitants of the city.

Ryan was created by Irrational Games' Ken Levine, based on figures like Ayn Rand, Howard Hughes, Charles Foster Kane, and Walt Disney. The character has received significant praise from critics, with Electronic Gaming Monthly ranking him ninth on their list of top ten video game politicians.<ref name="Scott Sharkey 2008">Scott Sharkey, "EGMs Top Ten Videogame Politicians: Election time puts us in a voting mood,” Electronic Gaming Monthly 234 (November 2008): 97.</ref> He is voiced by Armin Shimerman, whose voice acting was cited as one of the contributing factors to the success of BioShock as it won "Best Use of Sound" from IGN. Ryan has been compared to several different real-life and fictional figures, and his world of Rapture compared to the world of Galt's Gulch in the Ayn Rand novel Atlas Shrugged.

Concept and creation
BioShock director Ken Levine described Andrew Ryan (whose appearance is based on Vincent Price) as a character of ideals, in contrast to the game's other antagonist, Frank Fontaine, who has no ideals. Designing the encounter between the player and Ryan was a controversial decision for the developers due to the question of what the player's motive is at this point. Ryan taking his own life to prevent Jack, the protagonist, from accomplishing this, was described as the "ultimate insult" by Levine. The scene took a long time for the developers to finish. Levine stated that they figured out who the character of Andrew Ryan is too early, adding that they underestimated the impact that this would make. While he is saner than the opponents the players encounter before him, including a plastic surgeon who takes his ideal of beauty too far, he is as unmovable as he is unwilling to change his ideals. When discussing how many people would get the good ending to BioShock, he commented that Ryan would not be choosing to take the easier path.

In creating the world of Rapture, Levine imagined a utopia that its creators did not want the outside world to discover. Following this, he created the character of Ryan as its creator, giving him a "pseudo-objectivism and extremely capitalistic view on the world" as well as a fear that the New Dealers in the United States and communists in Russia would find Rapture. Levine states that to him, Ryan's philosophies come from Art Deco, describing the style as, "Yes, we are men, and we control the universe!" He considered Ryan a combination of historical figures such as Howard Hughes and Ayn Rand; and, though he compared Ryan to John Galt, he considered Ryan  more similar to a real person, making mistakes and having fear and doubts. Levine purposely named Ryan as he did, using a semi-anagram of Ayn Rand's name to establish the connection. During a questions and answers segment, a questioner stated that he did not want to kill Ryan, asking Levine, "Are [we] still doomed to make games where we have to use plot devices to clean that up?" to which Levine responded that video games were admittedly linear, saying that it was hard enough to come up with one good plot, let alone multiple ones. Levine stated that he did not expect the "ugly comedown from the stratospheric highs" from the Andrew Ryan scene near the end.

Role in BioShock
The player only encounters Ryan once in person throughout the entire BioShock franchise, with most of his appearance being made via radio transmission and audio diaries. Ryan's first appearance in the franchise is in BioShock, the first installment of the series.

Character history
Andrew Ryan's early history, like the rest of the character, was inspired by the early life of Ayn Rand. Like Rand, he was born in the Russian Empire, to a middle-class Russo-Jewish family.  It is established in BioShock 2 he was originally born Andrei; the novel BioShock: Rapture gives his birth name as Andrei Rianovski''', originally from a village near Minsk in modern-day Belarus. The Bolshevik Revolution in 1917 forced Ryan to flee Russia and immigrate to the United States (also like Rand). His experiences in Russia led to his hatred of communism, and the equally authoritarian regime of the Tsar which preceded it. In the United States, Ryan became an incredibly wealthy business magnate, and was initially content with the capitalist society the country offered him. However, as a result of governmental and religious interference in his affairs, he eventually became severely disillusioned. His response was to spend his entire fortune on the secret construction of Rapture, a city he could mold into his own image.

Throughout Rapture's history Ryan had frequent encounters with a businessman and smuggler named Frank Fontaine, who later became a leading figure in Rapture's genetic arms race towards the end of the 1950s. Despite always being suspicious of him, Ryan initially defended Fontaine's exploits in the genetics industry, stressing his core belief in free market. However, once Fontaine's businesses grew in such power that they began rivaling Ryan's own, Ryan took measures to curb Fontaine's influence. Once his smuggling activities were finally exposed, Ryan ordered his security chief to kill Fontaine. With the pressure on, Fontaine decided to fake his own death. With Fontaine seemingly gone, Ryan, in an unpopular move, nationalized Fontaine's business empire, bringing it under his hegemony. By this point though, in late 1958, the city was facing serious economic, social and political problems, which Ryan refused to compromise on. Exploiting this, Fontaine saw an opportunity to usurp Ryan from his position as de facto ruler of Rapture. He invented the alias of Atlas, mimicking an Irish accent and rallied the people against Ryan, leading them into a civil war in 1959 which tore the city apart. Ryan was victorious after resorting to the use of genetic pheromones which kept most of the populace subservient to him. Fontaine/Atlas was again forced into hiding. By this point however, the city had become a dystopia. Ryan descended into paranoia, withdrawing from society and ruling over the remaining populace as an increasingly ruthless tyrant. This alienated many of his former friends, some of whom betrayed him, only to be discovered and executed. He despotically impales their bodies on the wall outside his office as a warning to others. Despite the devastation brought about as a result of the fighting, he maintained the hope that his city would rise again.

BioShock
When Jack (the player's character in BioShock) arrives in Rapture in 1960, Ryan views him as a threat, initially believing him to be a government agent, most likely sent by the Russian KGB or the American CIA. Ryan attempts to do whatever possible to kill Jack, who is guided through Rapture by Fontaine, still disguised as Atlas. Over the course of the game, it is gradually revealed to the player that Jack is actually Andrew Ryan's illegitimate son. Years prior, in 1956, Ryan had sex with a young female stripper named Jasmine Jolene, resulting in her pregnancy, although Ryan was not aware of this. Fontaine, taking advantage of this opportunity, paid a high-ranking employee of his, Brigid Tenenbaum, to purchase the embryo from her. After Ryan became aware of this, he brutally murdered Jolene. The child was named Jack and Fontaine ordered a scientist under his employment, Dr. Yi Suchong to accelerate Jack's growth, and make him vulnerable to several mental techniques; one such technique was to force Jack to perform any requested action upon hearing the phrase "Would you kindly?" Jack, aged 2, already physically an adult at this point as a result of the genetic acceleration, was sent to live on the surface. Jack was Fontaine's "ace in the hole", a sleeper agent who would return to Rapture in the event the civil war didn't go his way. As Jack and Ryan shared the same genes, Jack would be able to bypass much of Rapture's genetic-based security. The package at the beginning of the game is revealed to be a gun, "Would you kindly..?" can be seen written on the accompanying note, sent by Fontaine, ordering Jack to hijack and crash the plane at the coordinates of the city.

When Andrew Ryan and Jack finally meet, Ryan states that Jack was his "greatest disappointment." Ryan gives a short monologue, revealing Jack's true past to him, and saying how little he differs from a slave. According to Ryan, "In the end, what separates a man from a slave? Money? Power? No. A man chooses, a slave obeys." Ryan hands Jack his golf putter, and then asks Jack, using the "Would you kindly?" phrase, to kill him, mockingly ordering him to "obey", which Jack is forced to do.

BioShock 2
Ryan also appears in BioShock's sequel, BioShock 2, largely through audio diaries, which give the player an expanded insight into Ryan's history and ideals. An early level of the game has the player visit 'Ryan Amusements', a theme park originally intended to indoctrinate the youth of Rapture with Ryan's ideology.

Multiplayer
He also appears via television in the multiplayer aspect of BioShock 2, set shortly before the events of BioShock, delivering a 1958 New Year's Eve speech to the citizens of Rapture. As the player progresses, the multiplayer story will end with a radio broadcast from Andrew Ryan, announcing Jack's arrival in Rapture, and ordering Rapture's populace to hunt him down 

BioShock Infinite: Burial at Sea
Ryan does not appear in Episode One of Burial at Sea, though a statue bearing his likeness is seen on a "No gods or Kings only man" plaque in the beginning of the DLC. He is also mentioned as the person that sent Fontaines Department store to the bottom of a Trench.

Ryan appears in Episode Two, when Elizabeth infiltrates one of his offices in search of a device. Ryan contacts Elizabeth via a screen, and impressed by her abilities, offers to collaborate with her. When she refuses, Ryan sends his men in to kill Elizabeth, though she manages to defeat them. After being fatally beaten by Atlas, a dying Elizabeth is given a glimpse into the future, showing Jack's arrival and the downfall of both Ryan and Atlas.

Characteristics
Andrew Ryan is always seen with his hair slicked back and sporting a smart suit and necktie. In an image the player encounters of Ryan during the 'Welcome to Rapture' and 'Rapture Central Control' levels, he can be seen wearing a black fedora. Ryan, whom Levine described as essentially an Objectivist, holds certain ideals and refuses to surrender or compromise on them. He has an enormous hatred of what he refers to as "parasites", consisting mainly of people who support left-wing political viewpoints, namely socialism and communism. Ryan also has a vast hatred for the religious, as well as the altruistic, as he believes altruism to be the root of all evil. A strong atheist, Ryan disregards all forms of organized religion. He has a firm belief in meritocracy, believing that a man who works hard is "entitled to the sweat of his brow".
 
Ryan coined his own economic philosophy which he calls the 'Great Chain of Industry', or simply the 'Great Chain', similar to the "invisible hand of the market" metaphor coined by Adam Smith. Crucial to this philosophy is the concept of free market, with Ryan asserting that all industry should be kept completely unfettered by government intervention. On the surface, when Congress moved to nationalize one of Ryan's privately owned forests, he preferred to burn it to the ground.  Ryan opposed all forms of regulation.

Superficially, Ryan accentuates these beliefs to the extreme, denouncing all forms of governmental control, including laws. In actuality however, Ryan had zero tolerance for certain crimes, notably theft (he was infuriated to learn citizens had discovered ways to hack the vending machines), as he believed this went against Rapture's founding principles. Political dissidence was also persecuted. Ryan utilized the services of people such as Augustus Sinclair, who offered to imprison Ryan's enemies in his private detention facility, Persephone, for profit. Sofia Lamb, the main antagonist of BioShock 2 was initially invited to Rapture at Ryan's request, only to be later imprisoned at Persephone as it became clear her politics clashed with that of Ryan's. Whilst strongly discouraged, but not outright illegal initially, smuggling was eventually outlawed and made a hanging offence by Ryan as "Any contact with the surface exposes Rapture to the very parasites we fled from. A few stretched necks are a small price to pay for our ideals."

In essence, Ryan is a vociferous dictator, ruling without restraint and answerable to no-one. Though he founded the city on the principle that mankind should possess free will, he ultimately betrayed this cherished belief when it became possible he might lose the civil war in Rapture. He authorized the use of a pheromone which made Rapture's citizens vulnerable to his mental suggestion, thus ending the conflict, though he did so with much reluctance. Similarly, despite seemingly betraying all his core ideals, he still didn't refrain from nationalizing Fontaine's businesses once it became necessary to do so in order to cement his power over the city.

Reception

In his review article of BioShock, IGN editor Charles Onyett described him as "anything but a prototypical villain", describing him as having a bottomless ambition for creating a city at the bottom of the sea. He added that while his words resemble "totalitarian propaganda", players cannot help but sympathize with him.
During a discussion about the potential plot of the game's sequel BioShock 2, editor Hilary Goldstein said that Ryan should reappear in it, and that while it should be in a new area, it should still have connections to him. Onyett called Ryan a key element, and if not included in the sequel, there would be a dramatic loss of personality. He claimed that much of Rapture's personality comes from Ryan, and it would have much less of an impact without him. Editor Ryan Geddes agreed, adding that he felt there was more to Ryan than Rapture. Editor Nate Ahem suggested that a sequel could potentially put the players in the role of Ryan, to explore the story of trying to create a perfect world and having it crumble beneath their feet. Adam Volk of Gamasutra described him as a fascinating take on the mad scientist character, adding that if more developers steer away from stereotypes of the character type, these characters could easily rival those in film, television, or novels. In the book Halos and Avatars: Playing Video Games with God, author Craig Detweiler calls him an "obvious reference to the objectivist writer and philosopher Ayn Rand".

Onyett praised Shimerman for his portrayal of Ryan, calling him a "joy to listen to" and adding that he would "give Stephen Colbert a run for his money." 411 Mania editor Adam Larck agreed, praising the introduction Ryan gives to the player as they enter Rapture. Game Chronicles editor Mark Smith praised the voice acting of the game, praising Shimerman's commitment to the story and theme. Total PlayStation editor gave similar praise to Shimerman, commenting that he and Atlas' voice actor rounded out the cast. Worthplaying editor Brian Dumlao commented that Ryan's voice "conveys ... the struggle of a man whose ideals are being threatened by a rival businessman", and praising the delivery of the actors to why the story is so good. In their Game of the Year awards, IGN praised the voice acting, citing Ryan's speech he delivers to players as what convinced them. They awarded BioShock "Best use of sound".

He has been compared to several other characters in fiction and real life. Ryan's world of Rapture has been compared to that of Ayn Rand's Atlas Shrugged. Blog Critics editor described Ryan as arrogant, greedy, and naive, adding that these traits led Rapture to destruction. Lou Kesten of the San Francisco Chronicle also made this comparison, comparing the name "Andrew Ryan" to the author, "Ayn Rand", in its similarity. Onyett agreed, describing him as a "Randian hero". He has also been compared to the eponymous character of Citizen Kane. Official Xbox Magazine editor Dan Griliopoulos likened his appearance to that of Gomez Addams, the father from The Addams Family. IGN editors Phil Pirrello and Christopher Monfette described him as being more communist than Vladimir Lenin, the first head of state of the Soviet Union, also comparing him to Italian philosopher and writer Niccolò Machiavelli. While discussing potential actors who could portray Ryan in a BioShock film, IGN editors chose Anthony Hopkins as the perfect choice for the role.

Andrew Ryan has appeared in a number of "top" character lists. Gamasutra editor Leigh Alexander ranked him the third most affecting character of 2007, behind GLaDOS from Portal and player-created characters such as in massive multiplayer online role-playing games. Leigh calls him a  "cautionary example of the danger of pure philosophy", adding that while he begins as the primary antagonist, players sympathize with him once it becomes clear that he is so "bitterly wrong". Guinness World Records Gamer's Edition listed Andrew Ryan as 15th in their list of "top 50 video game villains". IGN placed Andrew Ryan at number 10 in their list of the Top 100 Videogame Villains, saying, "The force of his personality and clarity of his vision is admirable throughout the game. Rapture wouldn't be nearly as interesting without Ryan and his complementing the action and exploration, shouting propaganda and taking every opportunity to broadcast his world view." The PlayStation Official Magazine placed him as the eighth best videogame villain on PS3. Bit-Tech placed Ryan #10 on their top ten list of gaming NPCs. He is ranked ninth in Electronic Gaming Monthlys list of the top ten video game politicians. GamesRadar staff ranked Andrew Ryan 6th place on their list of the best video games villains.

A species of marine gastropod named Rapturella ryani'' was named after Ryan in 2016.

See also
 List of characters in the BioShock series

References

External links

BioShock (series) characters
Fictional atheists and agnostics
Fictional businesspeople in video games
Fictional American Jews in video games
Fictional immigrants to the United States
Fictional mass murderers
Fictional murdered people
Fictional Russian Jews
Fictional Russian people in video games
Male characters in video games
Video game antagonists
Video game characters based on real people
Video game characters introduced in 2007
Disney parodies